Komoni may refer to:
 Komoni, Comoros
 Komoni, Iran